Bulbophyllum pulvinatum is a species of Orchidaceae in the genus Bulbophyllum. The orchid's flowers are golden yellow, and it can be found in New Guinea.

References

The Bulbophyllum-Checklist
The Internet Orchid Species Photo Encyclopedia

pulvinatum